Pierre Ramses Pe Akono (born 29 June 2000) is a Cameroonian footballer who plays as a midfielder for Spanish side Alcoyano.

Career statistics

International

References

External links
 

2000 births
Living people
Cameroonian footballers
Cameroon international footballers
Association football midfielders
Eding Sport FC players
K.A.S. Eupen players
CD Alcoyano footballers
Cameroonian expatriate footballers
Cameroonian expatriate sportspeople in Belgium
Expatriate footballers in Belgium
Cameroonian expatriate sportspeople in Spain
Expatriate footballers in Spain